Frederick Butler Thurber (1883–1971) was a sailing champion. The Frederick B. Thurber Invitational Trophy Race is named for him.

Biography
He and Theodore R. Goodwin and Thomas Fleming Day sailed the Atlantic Ocean in Seabird (ship).

References

1883 births
1971 deaths
American male sailors (sport)
Place of birth missing